The 1969 Rhode Island Rams football team was an American football team that represented the University of Rhode Island as a member of the Yankee Conference during the 1969 NCAA College Division football season. In its seventh and final season under head coach Jack Zilly, the team compiled a 2–7 record (1–4 against conference opponents), tied for last place in the Yankee Conference, and was  outscored by a total of 226 to 88. The team played its home games at Meade Stadium in Kingston, Rhode Island.

Schedule

References

Rhode Island
Rhode Island Rams football seasons
Rhode Island Rams football